Analogia iuris is the concept that legal consequences can derive from the spirit of the law as is often the case in continental European law. It can be contrasted with analogia legis, whereby legal consequences arise from the wording of statutes.

See also
Analogy

References

Law